Peter Whitehead (born 3 December 1964) is a British long-distance runner. He competed in the men's marathon at the 1996 Summer Olympics.

References

External links
 

1964 births
Living people
Athletes (track and field) at the 1996 Summer Olympics
British male long-distance runners
British male marathon runners
Olympic athletes of Great Britain
Place of birth missing (living people)